Abhishek Majumdar is an Indian playwright and theatre director.

He is the ex artistic director and founder of two theatre companies, Indian Ensemble and Bhasha Centre for Performing Arts, both based out of Bangalore. His plays include The Djinns of Eidgah  and Pah-la, both of which have been staged in London. Other plays include Pratidwandi, Harlesden High Street, An Arrangement of Shoes, Afterlife of Birds, Rizwaan, Kaumudi, Dweepa, Muktidham, Baatin, Tathagat and Salt.

References

 Pah-La review – fascinating Tibetan drama sets theatre ablaze
 As Abhishek Majumdar's Djinns of Eidgah is staged at Edinburgh Fringe, a conversation with the playwright-director - Living News , Firstpost
 The Djinns of Eidgah – review
 Abhishek Majumdar speaks about The Djinns of Eidgah
 In the name of Ram

Living people
Indian dramatists and playwrights
Year of birth missing (living people)